Laticola is a genus of monopisthocotylean monogeneans, belonging to the family Diplectanidae. All known species are parasitic on the gills of marine fish, including members of Lates (Latidae) and Epinephelus (Serranidae).

The genus was proposed for species with a spoon-shaped male copulatory organ with two to four concentric incomplete ridges in the base.

Species
According to the World Register of Marine Species, the valid species included in the genus are:
 Laticola cyanus Sigura & Justine, 2008 
 Laticola dae Journo & Justine, 2006 
 Laticola latesi (Tripathi, 1959) Yang, Kritsky, Sun, Zhang, Shi & Agrawal, 2006 
 Laticola paralatesi (Nagibina, 1976) Yang, Kritsky, Sun, Zhang, Shi & Agrawal, 2006 
 Laticola seabassi (Wu, Li, Zhu & Xie, 2005) Domingues & Boeger, 2008

References

Diplectanidae
Monogenea genera
Parasites of fish